Lewald or Lewałd may refer to:

Lewald (surname)
Lewałd Wielki, a village in Poland
Lawalde (Upper Sorbian: Lĕwałd), a municipality in Saxony, Germany
Lewald Glacier in Antarctica